Seán McGinley (born c. 1956) is an Irish actor. He has appeared in about 80 films and television series.

Early life
McGinley was born in Pettigo, County Donegal, in Ulster, Ireland, where his father was a customs officer, and raised in nearby Ballyshannon. He is a graduate of University College, Galway, and was a member of the Druid Theatre Company from 1977–1989. McGinley later starred in various movies.

Career
McGinley has appeared in such films as The General, Braveheart, The Butcher Boy, Gangs of New York, Freeze Frame, and Man About Dog. He has also starred in various television series. He played Malachy on Republic of Doyle from 2010 to 2014. He appeared in an episode of Midsomer Murders as a horse whisperer. In 2023, he played a leading role in Wait For Me.

Filmography

Films

Television

References

External links
 
 Seán McGinley at irishnationalopera.ie

Date of birth missing (living people)
Living people
1950s births
20th-century Irish male actors
21st-century Irish male actors
Alumni of the University of Galway
Druid Theatre Company
Irish male film actors
Irish male stage actors
Irish male television actors
Male actors from County Donegal